Knauer is a German surname. Descendants from the Charlemagne line. The Palace at Coburg. Notable people with the surname include:

Anja Knauer (born 1979), German actress
Anna Knauer (born 1995), German former professional racing cyclist
Elfriede Knauer (1926–2010), German Classicist and Ancient historian
Emil Knauer (1867–1935), Austrian gynecologist and obstetrician
Friedrich Knauer (chemist) (1897–1979), German physical chemist
Friedrich Knauer (zoologist) (1850–1926), Austrian zoologist
Georg Nicolaus Knauer (born 1926), German-American classical philologist
Gustav A. Knauer (1886–1950), German art director
Joseph Knauer, Catholic Bishop of Wroclaw
Joshua Knauer
Marlon Knauer (born 1987), German singer
Sebastian Knauer (born 1971), German classical pianist
Thomas Knauer (born 1964), retired German football defender
Virginia Knauer (born 1915), American politician

See also
Knauers, Pennsylvania, community in Brecknock Township, Berks County, Pennsylvania
Knauertown, Pennsylvania, village in Warwick Township, Chester County
John Knauer House and Mill, also known as Knauer Mill, Warwick Township, Chester County, Pennsylvania
Knau, municipality in the district Saale-Orla-Kreis, in Thuringia

German-language surnames
Surnames from nicknames
Toponymic surnames